Dana S. Richards is a writer, mathematics popularizer and Associate Professor in Computer Science at George Mason University.

His research interests include comparisons of protein sequences, Steiner tree algorithms, information dissemination in networks, parallel heuristics, methodology for computationally intractable problems and parallel algorithms for median filters.

Education and career
Richards received an M.S. from the University of Virginia in 1976 and a Ph.D. in computer science from the University of Illinois at Urbana-Champaign under Chung Laung Liu in 1984.

He was an Assistant Professor of Computer Science at the University of Virginia, and a Program Director of Theory of Computing at the National Science Foundation  (June 1993 through May 1994).

He has written or edited seven books and numerous journal articles. In addition, he is a reviewer for many journals, and has received numerous research awards. He became an Associate Professor of Computer Science at George Mason University in 1994.

Martin Gardner
Dana Richards was a friend and biographer of Martin Gardner. In his writing and speaking he often memorialized and popularized his work.
In 2006 he edited The Colossal Book of Short Puzzles and Problems which collected all of Gardner's short puzzles in one volume. He wrote Gardner's obituary in Science. 

Since Gardner's death in 2010 events called Celebration of Mind are held every October which include games, magic and puzzles in the Gardner tradition, and Richards is frequently featured at these events discussing his life and work. He is also on the Martin Gardner Centennial Committee.

Books
 Dear Martin / Dear Marcello: Gardner and Truzzi on Skepticism by Dana Richards, April 28, 2017
 Problems in sorting and graph algorithms   OCLC 12048476 
 The colossal book of short puzzles and problems  
 The Mathemagician and Pied Puzzler 
 Dana Richards, "Martin Gardner: A 'Documentary' ", in The Mathematician and the Pied Puzzler: A collection in tribute to Martin Gardner (1999), ed.

References

External links
 official web page
 

Mathematics popularizers
Recreational mathematicians
University of Virginia alumni
University of Virginia faculty
University of Illinois Urbana-Champaign alumni
George Mason University faculty
Living people
20th-century American mathematicians
Year of birth missing (living people)